Kimberly Arely Díaz Auceda (born 28 April 2001) is a Honduran footballer who plays as a midfielder for the Honduras women's national team.

International career
Díaz made her senior debut for Honduras on 19 November 2021. She also capped during the 2022 CONCACAF W Championship qualification.

References

2001 births
Living people
Honduran women's footballers
Women's association football midfielders
Honduras women's international footballers